John Taylor  (born 1874) was a Welsh international footballer. He was part of the Wales national football team, playing 1 match on 28 March 1898 against England. At club level, he played for Wrexham.

See also
 List of Wales international footballers (alphabetical)

References

1874 births
Welsh footballers
Wales international footballers
Wrexham A.F.C. players
Place of birth missing
Year of death missing
Association footballers not categorized by position